John Knapton (born 10 March 1949) was Professor of structural engineering at University of Newcastle from 1991 to 2001, and has written a number of textbooks on the subject of concrete construction. He has also worked as a consultant and expert witness in matters relating to concrete, including a report for Lloyds insurers on whether the design of the World Trade Center towers had contributed to their collapse on 9/11: he concluded that "the way they were designed and built actually prevented them from falling over and thus would have saved around 100,000 lives which would have been directly in their paths had they fallen over."

Publications
Ground bearing concrete slabs London : Telford, 2003. 
Single Pour Industrial Floors  London : Telford, 1999. 
In-Situ Industrial Hardstandings  London : Telford, 1999.

External links
Author biography at Thomas Telford Publishing
Personal web site

References

Living people
1949 births
British structural engineers
Academics of Newcastle University